Mujhe Kuch Kehna Hai is a Pakistani television sereis directed by Shahood Alvi, who also played the leading role in the series alongside Sabreen Hisbani and Mira Sethi. It is produced by Babar Javed and Asif Raza Mir under banner A&B Entertainment. It first aired on 4 November 2015 on Geo Entertainment.

Plot 
The story starts off as the unhappy married life of a couple, Moazzam and Shazma who treat each other as strangers, despite living together. They have two daughters Seerat and Baseerat, the only reason to retain of their marriage. Moazzam and Shazma, who once were ideal partners and sincere with each other, are now themselves distant following the arrival of another girl, Seemab. Upon calling his marriage as compromise, Moazzam decides to separate with her. On knowing it, Shazma is torn apart as her only priority was her family. However, she faces the reality and starts earning livelihood for her daughters, as the sole breadwinner of the family.

Cast 
 Shahood Alvi as Moazzam
 Sabreen Hisbani as Shazma
 Mira Sethi as Seemab
 Anwar Iqbal
 Faiza Gillani
 Arisha Razi
 Mahi Baloch
 Kiran Abbasi

Broadcast
The series first broadcast on Geo Entertainment on 4 November 2015 and last aired on 11 February 2016 after completing 28 episodes.

Reception 
The nuanced and strong depiction of the female protagonist was praised by the critics.

References

External links 

2015 Pakistani television series debuts
2016 Pakistani television series endings
Geo TV original programming
Pakistani television series
Urdu-language television shows